Anthony Kituuka is a Ugandan accountant, business executive and banker. He is the managing director and chief executive officer of Equity Bank Uganda, a commercial bank in that country, effective November 2022.

From 2016 until 2022, he was the executive director of Equity Bank Uganda, under the leadership of his predecessor as CEO, Samuel Kirubi, a Kenyan national.

Education
Kituuka had his primary and secondary education in Uganda. He then entered the Makerere University, Uganda's oldest and largest public university, where he graduated with a Bachelor's degree in Statistics and Economics. His second degree, an MBA in Oil and Gas, was obtained from Middlesex University, in the United Kingdom. He is also a Fellow of the Association of Chartered Certified Accountants, designated by the letters FCCA.

In addition, he has completed advanced management courses and executive leadership programs from Strathmore Business School, Lagos Business School, IESE Business School, Gordon Institute of Business Science and INSEAD.

Work experience
As of November 2022 his work experience went back, over 15 years. His banking career began at Barclays Bank Uganda (today Absa Bank Uganda Limited), as a corporate relations manager. When he left Barclays, he was hired by KCB Bank Uganda, where he spent six years, rising to the position of head of corporate banking. He was seconded to the bank's group headquarters in Nairobi, Kenya, where he spent the last nine months. He was then hired in 2014 by Equity Bank Group, as the group executive director, responsible for regional subsidiaries in five African Great Lakes countries.

At Equity Bank Uganda, Kituuka replaces Samuel Kirubi, who served as CEO from 2015 until 2022. Kirubi was transferred to the group headquarters in Nairobi, Kenya to serve as the group chief operating officer (Group COO) for the current six banking subsidiaries. Kituuka is the first Ugandan to serve as CEO at Equitty Bank Uganda.

See also
 Mathias Katamba
 List of banks in Uganda

References

External links
 Website of Equity Bank Uganda Limited

1975 births
Living people
Ganda people
Alumni of Middlesex University
Makerere University alumni
Ugandan bankers
Ugandan accountants
Ugandan businesspeople
Ugandan chief executives
Ugandan business executives